Joseph Hasbrouck Frost (March 25, 1805 – 1866) was an American Methodist Episcopalian missionary in the Pacific Northwest.

Early life and career
In 1835, Frost began his time with the New York Conference, serving in Windham and Prattsville of New York State. The following year he was administered the spiritual needs of Franklin, New York. In 1838 Frost preached at Methodist Church in Bloomville.

Oregon Mission

In 1839, Frost was listed as an Elder in the New York Conference, noted by official records as being additionally appointed as a "Missionary to Oregon". He and his wife Sarah joined other Methodist members under Jason Lee on board the Lausanne in 1840 and later arrived at Fort Vancouver.

Clatsop Mission

Frost was given an appointment to open a new post among the Clatsop Chinookans, on the Clatsop Plains. This was near both Fort George and the mouth of the Columbia River in 1841. Until a residency was complete, Frost and his wife resided at Fort George as guests of James Birnie. The mission building site was built within the traditional territory of the Clatsop Chinookans.

Frustrated at his inability to convert the local Clatsop and Nehalem people, Frost took his family and left the area on 14 August 1843.  Previously in February 1842, Frost concluded that "there never will be anything like a permanent Christian church raised up among [the Clatsops]" and decided the budget of the mission "ought to be expended to better purpose elsewhere." Along with his family, Frost boarded the Bhering at the Honolulu port and sailed for the United States. They arrived at Boston on 21 March 1844.

Citations

Bibliography

 
 
 
 
 

 

1805 births
1866 deaths
American Methodist missionaries
Methodist Mission in Oregon
Methodist missionaries in the United States
Oregon clergy
Oregon Country
Oregon pioneers
People from Rochester, New York
19th-century American clergy